Jonathan Wilson may refer to:

 Jonathan Wilson (musician) (born 1974), American psychedelic folk musician
 Jonathan Wilson (writer) (born 1976), British sports journalist and author
 Jonathan Wilson (actor) (active since 1990), Canadian actor and playwright
 Jonathan Wilson (author) (active since 1994), British-born writer and professor 
 Jonathan Wilson (fighter) (born 1987), American mixed martial artist
 Dana Wilson (rugby league) (Jonathan Wilson, 1983–2011), rugby player from Cook Islands
 Jonathan Wilson, former member of the band Eisley

See also
 John Wilson (disambiguation)
 Johnny Wilson (disambiguation)
 Jonathan Wilson-Hartgrove, Christian writer and preacher